J. Michael Tatum is an American voice actor, ADR director and script writer working for Funimation/OkraTron 5000 And Bang Zoom! Entertainment who provides voices for a number of English versions of Japanese anime series and video games.

Biography
In 2005, Tatum ran into Funimation ADR director Christopher Bevins, who cast him as Rikichi in Samurai 7. Tatum has been cast in several notable roles, including Kyoya Ootori in Ouran High School Host Club, Sebastian Michaelis in Black Butler, Tomoe in Kamisama Kiss, France in Hetalia: Axis Powers, Erwin Smith in Attack on Titan, Okabe Rintaro in Steins;Gate, Eneru in One Piece, Tenya Iida in My Hero Academia and Rei Ryuugazaki in Free! – Eternal Summer.

From January 2010 to January 2014, he hosted That Anime Show podcasts with friend and co-worker Terri Doty and ADR Engineer Stephen Hoff.

At the Florida Supercon 2015 panel, when he was asked what was his inspiration to go into voice acting, Tatum said that when he was young he had a speech impediment and his speech coach had him get involved in theater. As he was reciting and memorizing scripts, they noticed that his stuttering started to gradually disappear. He then got into drama and theater acting, and that voice acting is great in that it enables him to play more characters than on camera.

In 2017, Tatum was cast for the English voice of Hideki Akasaka in Shin Godzilla. 

Since October 2018, he and Jamie Marchi co-host the ghost story podcast Ghoul Intentions.

Personal life 
Tatum is openly gay. During a panel at Ichibancon 2014, he had said that he came out to his family during his college years, with his father having already known about his sexuality for some time. On October 16, 2018, he became engaged to his long-time partner and fellow voice actor Brandon McInnis in Paris. He resides in Los Angeles, California.

Filmography

Anime

Animation

Films

Video games

References

 J. Michael Tatum and Terri Doty on ANN Cast

External links
 
 
 
 
 J. Michael Tatum at CrystalAcids Voice Actor Database

1976 births
Living people
American male video game actors
American male voice actors
Funimation
People from McKinney, Texas
Male actors from Texas
American gay actors
LGBT people from Texas
American voice directors
21st-century American male actors
American podcasters